Hero of the Patriotic War Medal is a medal of Azerbaijan. The medal was created on the occasion of Azerbaijan being the victor in the Second Nagorno-Karabakh War. Its recipient also received the distinctive title of Hero of the Patriotic War.

History 
On 11 November 2020, the President of Azerbaijan, Ilham Aliyev, at a meeting with wounded Azerbaijani servicemen who took part in the Second Nagorno-Karabakh War, said that new orders and medals would be established in Azerbaijan, and that he gave appropriate instructions on awarding civilians and servicemen who showed "heroism on the battlefield and in the rear and distinguished themselves in this war." He also proposed the names of these orders and medals. On 20 November 2020, at a plenary session of the Azerbaijani National Assembly, a draft law on amendments to the law "On the establishment of orders and medals of the Republic of Azerbaijan" was submitted for discussion.

The Hero of the Patriotic War Medal was established on the same day in the first reading in accordance with the bill "On the establishment of orders and medals of the Republic of Azerbaijan" on the occasion of Azerbaijan being the victor in the Second Nagorno-Karabakh War.

Awarding 
On 9 December, the President of Azerbaijan, Ilham Aliyev signed a decree to award 83 servicemen, 34 of them posthumously with the Hero of the Patriotic War Medal. The awardees included Hikmat Mirzayev, the commander of the special forces, Ilham Mehdiyev, the deputy chief of the State Border Service,  as well as the officers Namig Islamzadeh, Kanan Seyidov, and Zaur Mammadov.

Status 
The Hero of the Patriotic War Medal is awarded for "military merits in the complete defeat of the enemy, as well as high professionalism in the management of military operations or personal heroism in the restoration of the state borders of Azerbaijan". According to the bill, the medal's senior award is the Labor Order, while its junior award is the Qizil Ulduz Medal.

References 

Orders, decorations, and medals of Azerbaijan
2020 establishments in Azerbaijan
Awards established in 2020
Heroes of the Patriotic War